Vodafone M.I.C (Make It Count) is Fiji's own music reality TV show which is similar to  the format of American Idol. The show has had five successful seasons. Its sixth season is set for release next year. The show was created by Paul Dominiko. It is broadcast on Fiji TV and airs Tuesdays and Fridays from 7–8 pm (Fiji time)

How contestants are chosen 

The judges and producer travel to places in Fiji (Nadi, Suva, Labasa, Lautoka) where auditions take place. Judges observe the contestants and after auditions narrow hopefuls down. The remaining contestants return for a second audition round, here the top 10 finalists are chosen and go on to compete in the live shows.

Performance night 

Performance night happens two nights before the elimination night. This is where the contestants perform for public votes. Voting lines open at 8pm and close midnight(4 hours of voting time).

Elimination rounds 

Here the votes have been counted and the elimination takes place at the start of the show. The host reveals the bottom three and then the judges deliver who is eliminated(from voting results). The eliminated contestant then sings their swan song and the remaining contestants then continue the show and perform for more vote.

Season 1 

WINNER Nasoni Saloma

Runner upNina Doton

Rest of the top 10
Elena Baravilala

Judges 
Jon Apted, Abigale Young, Igelese Ete

Season 2 

WINNERIlisavani Cava

Runners up
Peniette Seru, Sofia

Judges
Jon Apted, Talei Burns, Igelese Ete

Season 3 
WINNER Matereti Koro

Runners upNatalie Raikadroka, Pauliasi Koroituicakau

Rest of the top 10
Lanza Coffin, Suliano Waqabaca, Kathlenn Waqa, Paulini Cava, Tupou Veikoso

Judges
Jon Apted, Talei Burns Laisa Vulakoro

Season 4 
Winner Romulo Leweniqila,

Runners-up Ana Silivale, Laisa Bulatale, Trent Leger,
 
Rest of the top 10Misiko Chute, David Rounds, Viva Dakua, Esther Baleniku, Carlos Powell, Mika,
 
Judges Allan Alo, Laisa Vulakoro, Charles Taylor.

Season 5 
Auditions for this year's show started on the 21st of April. The show premiered in May.

WinnerJosefa Lesi

Runners-up Jordeena Punja, Marilyn Mataiasi, Isaia Waqavou

Top 10
Isaia Waqavou, Marilyn Mataiasi, Pauline Tuidravu,  Josefa Lesi,  Sereima Banuve,  Ren Slatter,  Jordeena Punja,  Litia Rosi, Mosese Tikoduadua,  Pauliasi Cinavou

Judges Charles Taylor, Igelese Ete, Priscilla Williams

External links
Vodafone M.I.C @ Fiji TV

Mass media in Fiji
2000s reality television series